Victor Ferreira (born 10 July 1986) is a Dutch former professional basketball player who played for the Dutch Basketball League club Rotterdam Challengers during the 2010–2011 season. He played in 3 DBL games in his career, in which he averaged 7 minutes and 1.7 points per game.

References

External links
 Eurobasket.com profile

Dutch men's basketball players
1986 births
Dutch Basketball League players
Living people
Feyenoord Basketball players
Small forwards